The flag of Amsterdam is the official flag for Amsterdam, the capital of the Netherlands. The current design of the flag depicts three Saint Andrew's Crosses and is based on the escutcheon in the coat of arms of Amsterdam.

Meaning 
The colours of the flag are derived primarily from the shield of Amsterdam's coat of arms. According to the city government, its origin could go back to the coat of arms of the Persijn family, which once owned a large tract of land in the capital.  These colors, as well as the crosses, are to be seen in the flags of both Ouder-Amstel and Amstelveen.

The popular legend that the three Saint Andrew's crosses were meant to ward off fire, floods and the black plague is unfounded as the use of three St. Andrews crosses by noble families in the area precedes the arrival of the Black Death in Europe.

In the coats of arms of two other Dutch cities, Dordrecht and Delft, the middle stripe symbolises water. In regards to Amsterdam, this black strip becomes the River Amstel. This could be why other references state that the three crosses represent three fordable places in the river Amstel.

History 
 
The flag was officially adopted on 5 February 1975 although it was already in use before this date, seen for example on the cover of the day programme of the 1928 Summer Olympics held in Amsterdam. Before its official adoption there was also an unofficial use of a flag with the city's coat of arms in the middle of a red-white-black horizontal tricolor. Such a design was already in use in the 17th century, but in Amsterdam history, other designs in the colors red, black and white were also used. Sometimes the three St. Andrew crosses were placed in the white orbit of the red-white-blue Dutch national flag.

Symbolism 
The meaning of the crosses is unknown, but historians assume that it is derived from the coat of arms of the family Persijn (Mr Jan Persijn is mentioned as founder of "that place" the current Dam). Other possessions of this family, Amstelveen and Ouder-Amstel (Duivendrecht and Ouderkerk aan de Amstel) carry similar coats of arms derived from the family coat of arms.

It is also reported that the crosses represent the three plagues that have hit Amsterdam, namely water, fire and plague.  The three crosses can be found on all kinds of buildings, in many logos and also on the Amsterdammertjes. Another theory is that the three crosses represent three fords in the Amstel.

February Strike Flag 

The February Strike Flag was awarded to the city by Queen Wilhelmina on December 17, 1947.  It was a token of appreciation for the massive resistance of the people of Amsterdam against the Jewish persecution, as expressed during the February strike in 1941. The flag is an important symbol in the annual commemoration of the strike.  The flag was designed by Pam Rueter and made by students of the Industrial School for Women's Youth.  A copy was later made due to wear and tear.  The original flag ended up in a depot of the Amsterdams Historisch Museum in the 1970s, where it was recovered in 2008.  This banner was subsequently preserved for further preservation.

The flag consists of a variant of the city coat of arms on a white background and refers to the courage of the city during the World War II.  The resistance flag is raised at commemorations.

Uses 
AFC Ajax, an Amsterdam-based football team who plays in the Dutch Eredivisie, uses the Amsterdam flag as their captain's armband.

Historical flags

References

Flags introduced in 1975
Flag
Flag
Flags of cities in the Netherlands
Saltire flags